Campaign shields, also known as campaign arm shields, were badges of differing design awarded to members of the German Wehrmacht for participation in specific battles or campaigns during World War II. Each shield was worn on the left upper arm of the uniform jacket. If a recipient received more than one shield, the earlier was worn above any later awards.

Official awards

Post-war versions
After an initial ban, the Federal Republic of Germany re-authorised the wearing of many World War II military decorations in 1957. This included all official campaign shields except for the Warsaw and Lapland Shields. Re-designed to remove the swastika emblem, members of the Bundeswehr could wear the shields on their ribbon bar, represented by a small replica of the award on a field grey ribbon.

Unofficial or discontinued prior to award 
Several shields were either unofficial or had approval withdrawn during the design phase, and were therefore never manufactured and awarded:

References

Sources 

Military awards and decorations of Nazi Germany
German campaign medals